As of the most recent college basketball season in 2021–22, 356 women's college basketball programs competed in NCAA Division I, including full D-I members and programs transitioning from a lower NCAA division (most from Division II and one from Division III). Five schools (Lindenwood, Queens, Southern Indiana, Stonehill, and Texas A&M–Commerce) will start transitions from Division II in 2022–23. One school, Hartford, started a transition from Division I to Division III in 2021–22, and will entirely leave D-I in 2023–24. Each program employs a head coach.

As of the next college season in 2022–23, the longest-tenured head coaches at their current schools are expected to be Geno Auriemma of UConn and Tara VanDerveer of Stanford, both of whom took their current positions in 1985–86. However, Auriemma has coached his team in one more season than VanDerveer, who took a leave in the 1995–96 season to coach the US women's national team at the 1996 Olympics. As of July 2022, a total of 54 programs have so far hired new head coaches, while some were filled by interim head coaches from the previous year.

Conference affiliations reflect those in place for the next 2022–23 college basketball season. This list also reflects coaching vacancies announced at the end of the 2021–22 season.

Notes

See also
 List of current NCAA Division I baseball coaches
 List of current NCAA Division I men's basketball coaches
 List of current NCAA Division I FBS football coaches
 List of current NCAA Division I FCS football coaches
 List of current NCAA Division I men's ice hockey coaches
 List of NCAA Division I men's soccer coaches

References

Basketball coaches, women's